Franck Chevallier (born 3 January 1964) is a French hurdler. He competed in the men's 110 metres hurdles at the 1984 Summer Olympics.

References

1964 births
Living people
Athletes (track and field) at the 1984 Summer Olympics
French male hurdlers
Olympic athletes of France
Place of birth missing (living people)